Gorodok is a rural locality (a village) in Boretskoye Rural Settlement of Vinogradovsky District, Arkhangelsk Oblast, Russia. The population was 41 as of 2010.

Geography 
Gorodok is located on the Tyoda River, 77 km southeast of Bereznik (the district's administrative centre) by road. Ostrovetskaya is the nearest rural locality.

References 

Rural localities in Vinogradovsky District
Shenkursky Uyezd